The Peace-Maker is an album by American saxophonist Harold Land recorded in late 1967 and early 1968 for the Cadet label.

Reception 

AllMusic awarded the album 4½ stars calling it a "one of the finest if little-known jazz LPs of its era. The Peace-Maker is a particularly apt title. The record's serene, supple contours glow with a lyricism that eschews the angularity of bop".

Track listing 
All compositions by Harold Land except as indicated
 "The Peace-Maker" - 5:10  
 "Stylin'" - 3:34  
 "40 Love" - 5:15  
 "Angel Dance" - 3:57  
 "Timetable" - 4:15  
 "Imagine" (Francis Lai, Sammy Cahn) - 3:22  
 "The Aquarian" - 5:25  
 "One for Nini" - 4:57

Personnel 
 Harold Land - tenor saxophone, flute
 Bobby Hutcherson - vibraphone
 Joe Sample - piano
 Buster Williams - bass
 Donald Bailey - drums, harmonica

References 

 

1968 albums
Harold Land albums
Cadet Records albums